Sir John Cust, 3rd Baronet PC (29 August 1718 – 24 January 1770), of Belton House near Grantham in Lincolnshire, was a British politician who served as Speaker of the House of Commons from 1761 to 1770.

Origins
He was the eldest son of Sir Richard Cust, 2nd Baronet (1680–1734) by his wife Anne Brownlow, daughter of Sir William Brownlow, 4th Baronet, of Belton House, and heiress in her issue of her brother John Brownlow, 1st Viscount Tyrconnel, 5th Baronet (1690–1754), of Belton House.

He was educated at Eton College and Corpus Christi College, Cambridge and studied law at the Middle Temple, where he was called to the bar in 1742.

Career
He was elected as a Member of Parliament for Grantham in 1743, which seat he continued to represent until his death 27 years later. In 1754 his mother inherited Belton House from her childless brother, John Brownlow, 1st Viscount Tyrconnel, the last male of the Brownlow family. He was unanimously elected Speaker of the House of Commons in 1761, and unanimously reelected in 1768. He was admitted to the Privy Council in 1762.

On 17 January 1770, Cust sent word to the House of Commons that he was too ill to attend. He resigned on 19 January; his successor Sir Fletcher Norton was elected on 22 January. Cust died on 24 January 1770, aged 51. His memorial in Belton church was created by William Tyler RA.

Marriage and progeny
In 1743 he married Etheldreda Payne, a daughter of Thomas Payne, by whom he had two sons and two daughters, including:
Brownlow Cust, 1st Baron Brownlow, 4th Baronet (1744–1807), who succeeded his father in the baronetcy and in 1776 was raised to the peerage as Baron Brownlow in recognition of his father's services.
 Elizabeth Cust (1750-1779), married Philip Yorke I (1743-1804) of Erddig House, as his first wife.

References

Sources

1718 births
1770 deaths
People educated at Eton College
Alumni of Corpus Christi College, Cambridge
Members of the Inner Temple
Baronets in the Baronetage of England
Speakers of the House of Commons of Great Britain
Members of the Parliament of Great Britain for English constituencies
British MPs 1741–1747
British MPs 1747–1754
British MPs 1754–1761
British MPs 1761–1768
British MPs 1768–1774
John